"Follow You Down" is a song by American rock band Gin Blossoms, and the first single released from their album Congratulations I'm Sorry. It was released as a double A-side single with "Til I Hear It from You" in the United States. The song received a fair amount of radio play and has been featured in several films, including How to Lose a Guy in 10 Days. It reached number nine on the US Billboard Hot 100 in a 46-week stay on the chart. It also became the band's second number-one single in Canada, after "Til I Hear It from You", and reached number 30 in the United Kingdom.

Background
According to an interview by Songfacts with Gin Blossoms songwriter Jesse Valenzuela, this song was written at the very end of the recording process for the Congratulations I'm Sorry album. Valenzuela recalled:

The song would ultimately become the biggest hit on the album, reaching number nine on the Billboard Hot 100.

Critical reception
Larry Flick of Billboard spoke positively of "Follow You Down", commenting that the song showcases "[the Gin Blossoms'] knack for crafting perfect pop hooks with sing-along lyrics". Greg Kot of the Chicago Tribune referred to the song as "easy-listening alterna-rock of the first order".

Track listings and formats

 Australian and US maxi-CD single
 "Follow You Down" (Edit) – 3:45
 "Til I Hear It from You" (LP version) – 3:46
 "Seeing Stars"  – 3:44
 "Idiot Summer"  – 4:10

 US 7-inch vinyl, cassette, and CD single
 "Follow You Down" (edit) – 3:45
 "Til I Hear It from You" (LP version) – 3:46

 German CD single and UK cassette single
 "Follow You Down" (edit) – 3:45
 "Allison Road" (LP version) – 3:18
 "Until I Fall Away" (LP version) – 3:51
 "Follow You Down" (LP version) – 4:30

 UK CD single
 "Follow You Down" (edit) – 3:47
 "Not Only Numb" (live) – 3:14
 "My Car" (live) – 4:09
 "Whitewash" (live) – 3:19

 Netherlands CD single
 "Follow You Down" (Edit) – 3:45
 "Allison Road" (LP Version) – 3:18

Credits and personnel
Credits and personnel are adapted from Congratulations I'm Sorry album liner notes.
 Robin Wilson – vocals, acoustic guitar
 Jesse Valenzuela – guitars, vocals
 Phillip Rhodes – drums, percussion, background vocals
 Bill Leen – bass, background vocals
 Scott Johnson – guitars, background vocals
 John Hampton – producer, engineering, mixing
 Erick Flettrich – engineering
 Billy Moss – assistant engineer at Vintage Recorders (Phoenix)
 Billy Siegle – pre-production engineer
 David Collins – mastering at A&M Mastering Studios (Hollywood)

Charts

Weekly charts

Year-end charts

Decade-end charts

Release history

References

Gin Blossoms songs
1996 singles
1996 songs
A&M Records singles
RPM Top Singles number-one singles
Songs written by Bill Leen
Songs written by Jesse Valenzuela
Songs written by Robin Wilson (musician)